Eupithecia segregata is a moth in the family Geometridae first described by Pearsall in 1910. It is found in the US states of Oregon, Arizona and California.

The wingspan is about 17 mm. It is a variable species. The basal half of the forewings is suffused with smoky shading, bordered outwardly by an irregular line passing through the discal streak. Beyond this, there is a broad, white, subterminal band, crossed by a faint, median, dark hairline. The terminal area is suffused with smoky in the apical half and again above the tornus. The hindwings are largely pale with a small, dark, basal patch and a moderately broad smoky terminal border. In another form, the forewings are entirely suffused with smoky grey. In coastal regions, adults are on wing from late February to April, but at higher altitudes in the Sierras, the flight time lasts till June.

References

Moths described in 1910
segregata
Moths of North America